John Ballantyne "Ivor" Lawson (2 May 1883 – 2 December 1958) was an Australian rules footballer who played for the Collingwood Football Club in the VFL in 1904, for the St Kilda Football Club from 1905 to 1907 and then for the Richmond Football Club between 1908 and 1909.

Lawson captained Richmond on three occasions as the then Captain/Coach Dick Condon resigned the captaincy late in the season after pressure from the club's board to do so.

References 

 Hogan P: The Tigers Of Old, Richmond FC, Melbourne 1996

External links 

 

Collingwood Football Club players
St Kilda Football Club players
Richmond Football Club players
Williamstown Football Club players
Australian rules footballers from Melbourne
1883 births
1958 deaths
People from North Melbourne